Cryptandra alpina, commonly known as alpine pearlflower, is a species of flowering plant in the family Rhamnaceae and is endemic to Tasmania. It is a small, prostrate shrub with slender branches, linear leaves, and tube-shaped white flowers arranged singly on the ends of branches.

Description
The flowers are arranged singly on the ends of branches with broad, overlapping brown bracts at the base, the inner bracts often nearly as long as the sepal tube. The petals are white, tube-shaped and form a hood over the stamens.

Taxonomy
Cryptandra alpina was first formally described in 1855 by Joseph Dalton Hooker in The botany of the Antarctic voyage of H.M. Discovery ships Erebus and Terror from specimens collected by Ronald Campbell Gunn. The specific epithet (alpina) means "alpine".

Distribution and habitat 

References

alpina
Rosales of Australia
Flora of Tasmania
Plants described in 1855
Taxa named by Joseph Dalton Hooker